Lozitsa may refer to the following places of Bulgaria:
 Lozitsa, Burgas Province, a village
 , a village in Nikopol Municipality
 Lozitsa, a Bulgarian wine region

See also 
 Lozica (disambiguation) (pronounced Lozitsa)
 Loznitsa